Moussa Diallo (born 20 November 1990) is a Senegalese footballer who plays in Luxembourg for FC Rodange 91.

References

1990 births
Living people
People from Dakar Region
Senegalese footballers
R.C.S. Verviétois players
RFC Liège players
K.A.S. Eupen players
FC Rodange 91 players
Belgian Pro League players
Senegalese expatriate footballers
Senegalese expatriate sportspeople in Belgium
Belgian expatriate sportspeople in Luxembourg
Expatriate footballers in Belgium
Expatriate footballers in Luxembourg
Association football forwards